The 2019 Major League Soccer season was the 24th season of Major League Soccer. The regular season began on March 2, 2019 and ended on October 6. The MLS Cup Playoffs began on October 19 and concluded with MLS Cup 2019 on November 10, under a new format that included 14 teams and consisted only of single-match rounds.

FC Cincinnati joined the league as an expansion franchise, bringing the total number of clubs to 24. Minnesota United FC opened their first soccer-specific stadium, Allianz Field, on April 13.

Atlanta United FC were the defending MLS Cup champions, while New York Red Bulls were the defending Supporters' Shield winners.

Los Angeles FC won their first Supporters' Shield with an MLS single-season record 72 points, while Seattle Sounders FC won their second MLS Cup title.

Teams

Stadiums and locations

The Portland Timbers announced in late 2018 that, due to expansion construction at Providence Park, they would play the first 12 games of the 2019 season on the road. The construction, which added about 4000 seats (bringing the total capacity to just over 25,000), also included a completely remodeled east side of the stadium, an updated concourse and concession stands on the west side of the stadium, a new scoreboard, ribbon boards and video board, and new turf. The stadium was expected to be ready to host MLS games in May or June 2019. The first home game for Portland in their renovated stadium was held on June 1, 2019, against Los Angeles FC.

Two stadiums were renamed during the season. First, on June 4, Exploria Resorts acquired the naming rights to Orlando City Stadium, which was accordingly renamed Exploria Stadium. Then, on June 13, the U.S. arm of the Spanish multinational bank BBVA announced a rebranding of the U.S. operations from "BBVA Compass" to "BBVA". As part of the rebranding, BBVA Compass Stadium became simply BBVA Stadium.

Personnel and sponsorship

Coaching changes

Regular season

Format
Each club played 34 games, including 17 home games and 17 away games. Teams faced each of their conference opponents twice during the season and non-conference opponents once. Half of the conference games were played at home, and half of the non-conference games were played away from home.

Conference standings

Eastern Conference

Western Conference

Overall table
The leading team in this table wins the Supporters' Shield.

Fixtures and results

Playoffs

Format
The MLS Cup Playoffs were expanded from 12 teams to 14 for the 2019 season, eliminating the use of two-legged series and re-seeding in favor of a shorter playoff format. The top seven teams in each conference advanced to a single elimination bracket, with the top team in each conference earning a first round bye. The MLS Cup Final took place on November 10, 2019.

Bracket

Attendance

Average home attendances

Highest attendances 
Regular season

Player statistics

Goals

Assists

Shutouts

Hat-tricks 

4 Scored 4 goals

Awards

Player of the Month

Player / Team of the Week
 Bold denotes League Player of the Week.
 Italics denotes Audi Player Performance of the Week.

Goal of the Week

End-of-season awards

MLS Best XI

Player transfers

SuperDraft

The MLS SuperDraft is an annual event, taking place in January of each year, in which the teams of Major League Soccer select players who have graduated from college or otherwise been signed by the league. The first two rounds of 2019 MLS SuperDraft were held on January 11 in Chicago. Rounds three and four of the 2019 SuperDraft were held via a conference call on January 14. FC Cincinnati selected Frankie Amaya with the first overall pick.

Allocation ranking
The allocation ranking is the mechanism used to determine which MLS club has first priority to acquire a player who is in the MLS allocation list. The MLS allocation list contains select U.S. National Team players and players transferred outside of MLS garnering a transfer fee of at least $500,000. The allocations are ranked in reverse order of finish for the 2018 season, taking playoff performance into account. As an expansion team, FC Cincinnati took the top spot.

Once the club uses its allocation ranking to acquire a player, it drops to the bottom of the list. A ranking can be traded provided that part of the compensation received in return is another club's ranking. At all times each club is assigned one ranking. The rankings reset at the end of each MLS season.

References

External links
 

 
2019